Kasaragod or Casrod  a taluk which along with Hosdurg taluk, Manjeshwaram Taluk and Vellarikundu taluk constitute  the Kasaragod district, Kerala, India. Its educational center is Vidyanagar. The major areas include Kasaragod municipality, Chemnad, Bedira, and Chengala. The Central Plantation Crops Research Institute is located in the taluk.

Villages in Kasaragod
Kasaragod taluk has 34 villages. 
 Adkathbail, Adoor, Adhur, Badiadka, Bandadka, Bedadka,
 Bela, Bellur, Chemnad, Chengala, Delampady, Kalnad
 Karivedakam, Karadka,  Kasaragod, Kolathur, Kudlu
 Kumbadaje, Kuttikole, Madhur, Muliyar, Munnad, Muttathody
 Neerchal, Nekraje, Nettanige, Pady, Patla, Perumbala
 Puthoor, Shiribagilu, Thalangara, Thekkil and Ubrangala

Demographics
According to 2011 census, Kasaragod taluk had a population of 681,736, which includes 332,754 males and 349,032 females. The average sex ratio is 1049 lower than state average of 1084. Total literacy rate is 89.45% lower than state average of 94%.
Kasaragod taluk constitutes 48.84% Hindus, 48.15% Muslims followed by 2.82% Christians and others.

As of 2011 Indian census, Kasaragod subdistrict had total population of 681,736, among which 480,405 (70.5%) registered  Malayalam as their mother tongue, 110,621 (16.2%) marked Tulu as their mother tongue, 43,664 (6.4%) marked Kannada as mother tongue, 18,718 (2.7%) marked Marathi as mother tongue, 15,378 (2.26%) marked Konkani as mother tongue, 5657 (0.83%) marked Urdu as mother tongue and 1.11% marked under other Indian languages.

References

External links 
 Official District Website
 Info Kasaragod

Geography of Kasaragod district
Taluks of Kerala